Jacob Henry Boyd (January 19, 1874 – August 12, 1932) was a Major League Baseball player for the Washington Senators.

References

External links

1874 births
1932 deaths
Major League Baseball outfielders
Major League Baseball pitchers
Major League Baseball infielders
Washington Senators (1891–1899) players
Baseball players from West Virginia
Sportspeople from Martinsburg, West Virginia
19th-century baseball players
Roanoke Magicians players
Portsmouth Browns players
Newark Colts players
New Bedford Whalers (baseball) players
Worcester (minor league baseball) players